The 1995 Cork Senior Hurling Championship was the 107th staging of the Cork Senior Hurling Championship since its establishment by the Cork County Board in 1887. The draw for the opening fixtures took place on 11 December 1994. The championship began on 14 May 1995 and ended on 24 September 1995.

Carbery entered the championship as the defending champions, however, they were beaten by Erin's Own in the second round.

The final was played on 24 September 1995 at Páirc Uí Chaoimh in Cork, between Na Piarsaigh and Ballyhea, in what was their first ever meeting in the final. Na Piarsaigh won the match by 1-12 to 3-01 to claim their second championship title overall and a first title in five years.

Niall Ahern was the championship's top scorer with 4-17.

Team changes

To Championship

Promoted from the Cork Intermediate Hurling Championship
 St. Catherine's

Results

First round

Second round

Quarter-finals

Semi-finals

Final

Championship statistics

Top scorers

Overall

In a single game

Miscellaneous

 Cork Regional Technical College play in the championship for the first time.

References

Cork Senior Hurling Championship
Cork Senior Hurling Championship